Mandhu College (formerly Mandhu Learning Centre) is a private college providing Higher Education in the Maldives. Mandhu College collaborates with universities in UK and Australia to provide accredited tertiary courses locally. The Mandhu Learning Centre was established in 1998, and later inaugurated as the Mandhu College in December 2009. The courses taught at Mandhu College are accredited by the Maldives Qualifications Authority.

Programs 
 Certificate III in Information Technology
 Certificate III in Business(Business Management)
 Certificate III in Tourism & Hospitality
 Certificate III in Teaching (Primary & Middle School)
 Advanced Certificate in Office Management
 Advanced Certificate in Teaching (Primary & Middle School)
 Advanced Certificate for Business & Information Technology
 Foundation Course for Degree Studies
 Diploma in Teaching (Primary & Middle School)
 Diploma in Business
 Diploma in Information Technology
 Associate Degree in Teaching
 Associate Degree in Business
 Associate Degree in Information Technology
 Bachelor of Education (Primary & Middle School)
 Bachelor of Education (Secondary)
 Bachelor of Business
 Bachelor of Information Technology
 Post Graduate Certificate in Business
 Master of Business Administration
 Master of Education

References

External links

Maldives Qualifications Authority approved local courses

Educational institutions established in 1998
Universities in the Maldives
Private universities and colleges
1998 establishments in the Maldives
Education in the Maldives
Educational organisations based in the Maldives